Boughton is the name of station under construction on the Northampton & Lamport Railway, which is built on the former Northampton to Market Harborough line. It is situated at the southern end of line adjacent to the former Boughton level crossing on the A5199. It is likely that Boughton will be the terminus of the railway for some time as to replace the level crossing will require large amounts of time and money.

The station consists of a platform and run-round loop, with associated signalling controlled from a new signal box which was formerly installed at Betley Road near Crewe. Adjacent to the station site is The Windhover pub. The "Brampton View" care village for the elderly opened in 2008. 

Boughton Crossing is also the southern end of the Brampton Valley Way, part of which has been diverted to make room for the passing loop at the station.

External links
Extension South progress from Northampton & Lamport Railway website

Heritage railway stations in Northamptonshire
Proposed railway stations in England